Züli Aladağ (born 2 January 1968, Van, Turkey) is a German film director, film producer, and screenwriter. He is of Kurdish and Turkish descent.

Biography 
Aladağ immigrated to Germany in 1973 and grew up in Stuttgart. After a short theatre study in Munich, he completed a six-month internship at Roland Emmerich's Moon 44 in Stuttgart. There, he followed numerous collaborators in shorts, advertisements, plays and documentary films as a production assistant, recording manager and director assistant. Later, he worked as an editor and co-director for documentary TV series. Since 1993, he has worked as a producer, and since 1995, he has been working as a freelance filmmaker on documentary films and feature films. He is often the author of his own books. He graduated from the Academy of Media Arts in Cologne in the summer of 1999.

His 2005 controversial drama, Rage (2006), was awarded several times.

In 2008, he directed a series of episodes of the television series Die Anwälte and KDD – Kriminaldauerdienst.

Aladağ is the founder of the Young European Cinema initiative. The filmmaker was married, from 2002 to 2012, to Feo Aladağ, with whom he founded his own film production company with in 2006. Since 2002, Aladağ has lived in Berlin.

Exhibitions 
 2010/2011: Die Anderen, Ausstellungsreihe Labor Berlin 3 in the Haus der Kulturen der Welt

Awards 
 1999: Prize of North Rhine-Westphalia for Film
 FFA-Kurz film prize for "Short Tiger 2000"
 2001: Wilhelm Bitter Prize 
 "Special recognition" by the German Academy of Performing Arts at the Baden TV Film Festival 2006 for the entire production team of Rage
 2007: Golden Camera Award by Hörzu for Rage.
 2007: Grimme-Preis for Rage
 2007: GLAAD Media Award for Rage
 2010: Deutscher Filmpreis for producing When We Leave

Filmography (selection) 
 1991/1992: Freispiel – Acting, recording
 1992:  – Recording
 1997: Hör dein Leben – Director, producer, scriptwriter, editor
 1997: Zoran – Director, scriptwriter
 1999: Bevor der Tag anbricht – Director, scriptwriter, editor
 1999: Der Ausbruch – Director, scriptwriter, editor
 1999: Enter – Producer
 2001/2002: Elefantenherz – Director, scriptwriter
 2003: Tatort –  – Director, scriptwriter
 2004: Die Türken kommen (Documentary film)
 2005: Tatort – Erfroren – Director
 2006: Rage – Director
 2010: When We Leave – Producer
 2010: Countdown – Die Jagd beginnt – Director (two episodes)
 2010–2011: Der Kriminalist – Director (four episodes), scriptwriter (one episode)
 2014:  – Director
 2015:  – Director, scriptwriter
 2015: Tatort – Schwerelos – Director
 2016: Tatort – Im gelobten Land – Director
 2016: NSU German History X:  – Director

Performances 
 2012: Neden? (Warum?), UA: Januar 2012 Ballhaus Naunynstraße, Berlin-Kreuzberg

References

Literature 
 Valerie Smith (Ed.): Die Anderen, Haus der Kulturen der Welt, Berlin 2010, .

External links 
 

Mass media people from Stuttgart
1968 births
Living people
German people of Turkish descent
German people of Kurdish descent
Turkish emigrants to Germany
German Film Award winners
People from Van, Turkey